Sten Reinkort (born 29 April 1998) is an Estonian professional footballer who currently plays as a forward for Meistriliiga club Flora and the Estonia national team.

International career
Reinkort made his senior international debut for Estonia on 12 January 2023, in a 1–0 victory over Finland in a friendly.

Honours
Flora
Estonian Supercup: 2021

Individual
Meistriliiga Forward of the Season: 2022

References

External links

1998 births
Living people
Sportspeople from Tartu
Estonian footballers
Association football forwards
Tartu JK Tammeka players
FC Flora players
FC Kuressaare players
Esiliiga B players
Esiliiga players
Meistriliiga players
Estonia youth international footballers
Estonia under-21 international footballers
Estonia international footballers